Allan Getchell McAvity (9 October 1882 – 24 June 1944) was a Liberal party member of the House of Commons of Canada. He was born in Saint John, New Brunswick and became an engineer and merchant.

McAvity attended Rothesay Collegiate then Harvard University where he earned an SB degree.

He was first elected to Parliament at the St. John—Albert riding in a by-election on 21 February 1938, after a previous unsuccessful attempt to win the riding in the 1930 election. After serving the remaining months of the 18th Canadian Parliament, McAvity was defeated in the 1940 election by King Hazen of the Conservative party.

Electoral history

References

External links
 

1882 births
1944 deaths
Canadian merchants
Harvard University alumni
Liberal Party of Canada MPs
Members of the House of Commons of Canada from New Brunswick
Politicians from Saint John, New Brunswick